Nicole Boudreau is a former politician in Montreal, Quebec, Canada. She served on the Montreal city council from 1986 to 1994, representing Longue-Pointe as a member of the governing Montreal Citizens' Movement (MCM).

She is not to be confused with a different Nicole Boudreau who led the Saint-Jean-Baptiste Society of Montreal from 1986 to 1989.

Early life
Boudreau worked as a medical secretary before her election to council. She also helped to form a CLSC (centre local de services communautaires) in Mercier-Est and served on its board of directors.

City councillor
Boudreau first ran for city council in the 1982 municipal election and lost to Civic Party incumbent Luc Larivée. She ran again in 1986 and this time defeated Larivée by a significant margin. Boudreau was forty-four years old at the time her election and, in a post-campaign interview, said that she would work for increased port facilities and green space along Montreal's land border with the St. Lawrence River. The MCM won a landslide majority in this election, and Boudreau served as a backbench supporter of Jean Doré's administration.

Boudreau was re-elected in the 1990 municipal election, in which the MCM won a second consecutive majority. In 1991, she was one of twelve MCM councillors who announced their support for a group calling for a referendum on Quebec sovereignty.

Boudreau was defeated by Vision Montreal candidate Claire St-Arnaud in the 1994 municipal election. She attempted to return to council in 1998, but was not successful.

Electoral record

References

Living people
Montreal city councillors
Women in Quebec politics
Women municipal councillors in Canada
Year of birth missing (living people)